The Electronics Corporation of Tamil Nadu Limited (ELCOT) is an Indian, public sector undertaking, established on 21 March 1977. ELCOT functions to promote, establish and run State Public Sector Enterprises for Electronic items; manage, supervise, finance, advise, assist, aid or collaborate with any private and public associations, firms, companies, enterprises, undertakings, institutions, and schemes for the advancement and development of electronics and information technology. It is considered the back office for the Information Technology Department of the Government of Tamil Nadu, and functions to implement the Government's E-Governance initiative.

References

External links

Companies based in Chennai
Information technology companies of India
Government agencies established in 1977
Government-owned companies of India
Science and technology in Tamil Nadu
Electronics industry in India
Electronics companies of India
1977 establishments in Tamil Nadu